Alvin Clark may refer to:
 Alvin Clark (schooner), a nineteenth-century schooner salvaged in 1969
 Alvin Clark (horseman), trainer of Grey Invader who ran in the Hong Kong Cup
 Alvin Clark, keyboardist on and producer for The Monochrome Set's album Love Zombies
 Alvin Clark, producer of X's album Live at the Whisky a Go-Go
 Alvin Clark, engineer on Buck-O-Nine's album Twenty-Eight Teeth
 Alvin Clark, father of American diplomat Alvin M. Owsley
 Alvin Clark, laid out Grandview, Iowa in 1841

People with the given names
Alvin Clark Owsley, member of the Twenty-first Texas Legislature

See also
Alvan Clark, nineteenth-century astronomer and telescope-maker
Alvan Clark & Sons
 Disappearance of Marvin Clark

Clark, Alvin